Cyperus renschii is a species of sedge that occurs across a large area of tropical Africa.

The species was first formally described by the botanist Johann Otto Boeckeler in 1882.

See also 
 List of Cyperus species

References 

renschii
Taxa named by Johann Otto Boeckeler
Plants described in 1882
Flora of Angola
Flora of Benin
Flora of Cameroon
Flora of the Central African Republic
Flora of the Comoros
Flora of the Republic of the Congo
Flora of the Democratic Republic of the Congo
Flora of Equatorial Guinea
Flora of Gabon
Flora of Ghana
Flora of Liberia
Flora of Ivory Coast
Flora of Kenya
Flora of Rwanda
Flora of Nigeria
Flora of Malawi
Flora of Tanzania
Flora of Sudan
Flora of Sierra Leone
Flora of Uganda
Flora of Zimbabwe
Flora of Zambia